Janina Domańska (28 July 1913 – 2 February 1995) was a Polish artist, author and illustrator. Domańska attended the Academy of Fine Arts in Warsaw, Poland. She moved to the United States in 1952, where she later married writer Jerzy Laskowski. Domańska is best known for her self-illustrated children's books. She won Caldecott Honors for her book If All the Seas Were One Sea in 1971.

Her other titles include The Tortoise and the Tree, Din Dan Don It's Christmas, Spring is, and The Best of the Bargain.

References

External links
 

1913 births
1995 deaths
American children's book illustrators
American children's writers
Polish children's writers
Artists from Warsaw
Polish emigrants to the United States
20th-century Polish women writers
20th-century American women writers